Dawson is an unincorporated community in Benton County, Oregon, United States.  Dawson lies about 6 miles west of 99W on Dawson Road west of Bellfountain, northwest of Alpine, and north of Glenbrook.

 

Unincorporated communities in Benton County, Oregon
Unincorporated communities in Oregon